Major General Michael Simon Hindmarsh  (born 1956) is an Australian military officer, who holds a senior position within the United Arab Emirates Armed Forces, commanding its elite force known as the Presidential Guard. A retired senior officer of the Australian Army, he spent over 30 years with the Australian Defence Force, during which time he served as Special Operations Commander Australia from 2004 to 2008, and as Commander of Joint Task Force 633 in the Middle East Area of Operations from March 2008 to January 2009. He retired from the Australian Army in mid-2009, and joined the United Arab Emirates Armed Forces as a special advisor and later, a commander of the UAE Presidential Guard, which is a  UAE Armed Forces formation that includes both conventional and special forces units.

Military career

Australia
Mike Hindmarsh entered the Royal Military College, Duntroon in 1976, graduating into the Royal Australian Infantry Corps in 1978.

Hindmarsh saw regimental service as a Platoon Commander with the 2nd/4th Battalion, Royal Australian Regiment and as a Troop Commander, Squadron Commander and Commanding Officer with the Special Air Service Regiment (SASR). Other appointments included: SO3 Operations at HQ Land Command; SO2 Training at HQ UK Special Forces; SO1 Operations at HQ Special Forces; and Brigade level tactics instructor at the Land Warfare Centre.

As Commanding Officer of the SASR, Hindmarsh commanded the ANZAC Special Operations Force detachment to Operation Pollard in Kuwait during 1998. Hindmarsh was later appointed to command the Special Operations Component on Operation Bastille and Operation Falconer in the Iraq War. He was appointed a Member of the Order of Australia for his distinguished leadership in this position.

He served as the Commander of the Australian Special Operations Command from October 2004 to February 2008. He was appointed an Officer of the Order of Australia in the Australia Day Honours of 2008 for his distinguished service in that position.

Hindmarsh assumed command of Australian Forces in the Middle East Area of Operations in an official ceremony on 1 March 2008; he succeeded Major General Mark Evans in this position. His tour ended on 12 January 2009, at which time he was succeeded by Major General Mark Kelly. For his "distinguished command and leadership in action in the Middle East", Hindmarsh was awarded the Distinguished Service Cross.

From March 2009 until his retirement from the Australian Army in the later half of 2009, Hindmarsh assumed command of Army Training Command at Victoria Barracks, Sydney.

United Arab Emirates
Following retirement from the Australian Army, Hindmarsh accepted the positions of Special Advisor – National Security to the United Arab Emirates, and major general in charge of the United Arab Emirates Presidential Guard. Hindmarsh was invited by Mohammed bin Zayed Al Nahyan to help reorganize the Emirati military. 

On 8 February 2016 an ABC News report questioned the extent of Hindmarsh's knowledge of civilian deaths allegedly caused during the operation of UAE forces in Yemen, as a result of his ongoing employment as a security advisor to the government.

Personal
Hindmarsh was educated at the Anglican Church Grammar School in Brisbane. He is a graduate of the Army Command and Staff College, Queenscliff, the Joint Services Staff College and the United Kingdom Royal College of Defence Studies.  He is married and has three sons. He enjoys rock climbing, bush walking and rugby union.

Honours and awards

Hindmarsh is a patron of The Grub Club, the organisation set up in memory of Sergeant Matthew Locke.

References

External links
Photos: 2004 (hires&smiling), 2009,  beret, Op Slipper handover, Farewell to General Petreaus, Op Catalyst   
"Always being ahead of the enemy", Australian Defence Magazine Feature, November 2004

1956 births
Military personnel from Queensland
Living people
Australian generals
Australian military personnel of the Iraq War
Australian military personnel of the War in Afghanistan (2001–2021)
United Arab Emirates Army officers
People from Queensland
Royal Military College, Duntroon graduates
Officers of the Order of Australia